Eels are elongated fish, ranging in length from  to . Adults range in weight from 30 grams to over 25 kilograms. They possess no pelvic fins, and many species also lack pectoral fins. The dorsal and anal fins are fused with the caudal or tail fin, forming a single ribbon running along much of the length of the animal.
Most eels live in the shallow waters of the ocean and burrow into sand, mud, or amongst rocks. A majority of eel species are nocturnal and thus are rarely seen. Sometimes, they are seen living together in holes, or "eel pits". Only members of the family Anguillidae regularly inhabit fresh water, but they too return to the sea to breed.

Eel blood is poisonous to humans and other mammals, but both cooking and the digestive process destroy the toxic protein. The toxin derived from eel blood serum was used by Charles Richet in his Nobel Prize-winning research, in which Richet discovered anaphylaxis by injecting it into dogs and observing the effect.

The Jewish laws of Kashrut forbid the eating of eels. Similarly, according to the King James Version of the Old Testament, it is acceptable to eat fin fish, but fish like eels are an abomination and should not be eaten.

Japan consumes more than 70 percent of the global eel catch.

Types of food
Freshwater eels (unagi) and marine eels (anago, conger eel) are commonly used in Japanese cuisine; foods such as unadon and unajuu are popular but expensive. Eels are also very popular in Chinese cuisine and are prepared in many different ways. Hong Kong eel prices have often reached 1000 HKD per kilogram and once exceeded 5000 HKD per kilogram. Eel is also popular in Korean cuisine and is seen as a source of stamina for men. The European eel and other freshwater eels are eaten in Europe, the United States, and other places. Traditional east London foods are jellied eels and pie and mash, although their demand has significantly declined since World War II. In Italian cuisine eels from the Valli di Comacchio, a swampy zone along the Adriatic coast, are especially prized along with freshwater eels of Bolsena Lake. Eels are popular in the cuisines of Northeast India. Freshwater eels, known as Kusia in Assamese, are eaten with curry, often with herbs.

Sustainability and conservation 

Eels are a Priority Species under the UK Post-2010 Biodiversity Framework. The European eel (Anguilla anguilla) is listed as Critically Endangered on the global IUCN Red List of Threatened Species. While the Japanese eel (Anguilla japonica) and American eel (Anguilla rostrata) are assessed as Endangered.

In 2010, Greenpeace International added the American eel, European eel, and Japanese eel to its seafood red list. "The Greenpeace International seafood red list is a list of fish that are commonly sold in supermarkets around the world, and which have a very high risk of being sourced from unsustainable fisheries."

The US government deems the commercial eel industry was worth $12 million in Maine in 2017.

History
The eel was a cheap, nutritious and readily available food source for the people of London; European eels were once so common in the Thames that nets were set as far upriver as London itself, and eels became a staple for London's poor. The first "Eel Pie & Mash Houses" opened in London in the 18th century, and the oldest surviving shop — M Manze — has been open since 1902.

Gallery

See also

 Eel life history
 Pie and mash

References

Works cited
 
 

Animal-based seafood
Elopomorpha
 
Commercial fish
Seafood
Fish as food
English cuisine
Japanese cuisine
New Zealand cuisine
Basque cuisine
German cuisine
Dutch cuisine
Czech cuisine
Danish cuisine
Swedish cuisine
Māori cuisine